The 1977 Clemson Tigers baseball team represented Clemson University in the 1977 NCAA Division I baseball season. The team played their home games at Beautiful Tiger Field in Clemson, South Carolina.

The team was coached by Bill Wilhelm, who completed his twentieth season at Clemson.  The Tigers reached the 1977 College World Series, their fourth appearance in Omaha.

Roster

Schedule

References

Clemson
Clemson Tigers baseball seasons
Atlantic Coast Conference baseball champion seasons
College World Series seasons